Bruno Laurioux is a French medievalist historian born in 1959 in Loudun.

Biography 

Alumnus of the École Normale Supérieure Lettres et Sciences Humaines (1979), Bruno Laurioux passes his History Agrégation (1982) and a PhD at the Pantheon-Sorbonne University with a thesis on "The Cookbooks in the West at the end of the Middle Ages" (1992).

He taught as a lecturer at the Paris 8 University (1993-1998) and at the Pantheon-Sorbonne University (1998-2005), and then as teacher at the Versailles Saint-Quentin-en-Yvelines University (since 2005), where he is deputy director of the host team ESR-Middle-Ages-modern times.

After having been Deputy Scientific Director for the ancient and medieval worlds in the Department of Humanities and Social Sciences of the French National Centre for Scientific Research (2006-2008), he becomes Director of the Department of Humanities and Social Sciences of the CNRS (2008). Appointed in February 2009 Director of the Institute of Humanities and Social Sciences of the French National Centre for Scientific Research, he retired the 15 April 2010.

Bibliography 
 Le Moyen âge à table (The Middle Ages at the table), Paris : A. Biro, 1989
 Les livres de cuisine médiévaux (Medieval cookbooks), Turnhout : Brepols, 1997
 Le règne de Taillevent : livres et pratiques culinaires à la fin du Moyen Âge (The reign of Taillevent : books and culinary practices in the late Middle Ages), Paris : La Sorbonne, 1997
 La civilisation du Moyen âge en France (XIe-XVe siècles) (The civilization of the Middle Ages in France (eleventh to fifteenth centuries), Paris : Nathan, 1998
 Éducation et cultures dans l'Occident chrétien du début du douzième au milieu du quinzième siècle (Education and culture in the Christian West from the early twelfth to the middle of the fifteenth century), Paris : Éd. Messene, 1998 (with Laurence Moulinier)
 Scrivere il Medioevo : lo spazio, la santità, il cibo : un libro dedicato ad Odile Redon, Roma : Viella, 2001 (dir.)
 Histoire et identités alimentaires en Europe (History and food identities in Europe), Paris : Hachette littératures, 2002 (with Martin Bruegel)
 Manger au Moyen âge : pratiques et discours alimentaires en Europe aux XIVe et XVe siècles (Eating in the Middle Ages: food practices and discourses in Europe in the fourteenth and fifteenth centuries), Paris : Hachette littératures, 2002
 Une histoire culinaire du Moyen âge (A culinary history of the Middle Ages), Paris : H. Champion, 2005
 Gastronomie, humanisme et société à Rome au milieu du XVe siècle. Autour du De honesta voluptate de Platina (Food, humanism and society in Rome in the middle of the fifteenth century. Around the De honesta voluptate Platina), Firenze : SISMEL -Edizioni del Galluzzo, 2006

See also 
Agostino Paravicini Bagliani

References

1959 births
Living people
People from Loudun
20th-century French historians
Academic staff of Versailles Saint-Quentin-en-Yvelines University
French male non-fiction writers
21st-century French historians
Research directors of the French National Centre for Scientific Research